WSDV (1450 AM) is a commercial radio station licensed to Sarasota, Florida, and broadcasting to the Sarasota - Bradenton radio market. The station airs a hot adult contemporary format and is owned by iHeartMedia, Inc.  

WSDV is powered at 1,000 watts non-directional.  Programming is also heard on FM translator W280EV. The station uses the translator's dial position, calling itself "103.9 Kiss FM".

History
On December 7, 1939 the station first signed on the air.  Its call sign was originally WSPB, powered at 250 watts, located at 1420 kilocycles.  Its tower and studios were on City Island.  The North American Regional Broadcasting Agreement (NARBA) in 1941 moved its dial position to 1450 kHz.  

WSPB became a CBS Radio Network affiliate, airing CBS's line up of dramas, comedies, news, sports, soap operas, game shows and big band broadcasts.  It was unique among stations on the Gulf Coast of Florida to run hourly news updates before this was a common practice.  

In 1965, WSPB-FM signed on at 106.3 (now WRUB at 106.5) as a full-time simulcast of the AM.  There have been many formats at 1450, ranging from Classical Music in the 1990s to Oldies later in the decade.  For part of the 1990s, the station, using the WSPB call sign, simulcast co-owned Tampa talk radio station WFLA 970 AM until 2002.  At that point, it switched to adult standards, using the WSRQ call letters beginning in 2003.

On January 3, 2014 WSDV and its simulcast sister station WDDV 1320 AM in Venice, Florida, rebranded themselves as "Sunny" and diverted from adult standards to an Oldies/Soft AC format.

On March 17, 2016 WSDV and WDDV switched to a talk radio format.

On November 1, 2017 WSDV split from its simulcast with WDDV and began stunting with Christmas music. On January 1, 2018, at midnight, the station became 103.9 Kiss FM with a Top 40/CHR format.  It is the only iHeartMedia-owned KISS-FM station on the AM band, although most of its listeners tune in the 103.9 translator to hear the station in FM stereo.

On November 11, 2022, at 5 p.m., WSDV dropped the "Kiss FM" brand for Christmas music as "103.9 Santa FM" but it returned back to Kiss FM on December 31, 2022.

References

External links

SDV
IHeartMedia radio stations
Hot adult contemporary radio stations in the United States
Radio stations established in 1939
1939 establishments in Florida